Jakko Jan Leeuwangh (born 9 September 1972) is a former speed skater from the Netherlands. He finished fourth in the 1998 Olympic 1000 m event. In January 2000 he broke the 1500 m world record in Calgary, Canada, holding the record until it was broken by Lee Kyou-hyuk in March 2001.

Records

Personal records

World records

Source: SpeedSkatingStats.com

Tournament overview

source:

References

External links
 Jakko Jan Leeuwangh at SpeedSkatingStats.com

1972 births
Dutch male speed skaters
Speed skaters at the 1998 Winter Olympics
Olympic speed skaters of the Netherlands
World record setters in speed skating
Sportspeople from Alkmaar
Living people
World Single Distances Speed Skating Championships medalists